Jamie R. Smith (born January 31, 1971) is an American politician who serves as a member of the South Dakota House of Representatives. Smith represents District 15, which covers downtown neighborhoods, including areas around Terrace Park and the Great Plains Zoo, in Sioux Falls. He has served as House Minority Leader since the 2019 legislative session. 

Smith was the Democratic nominee in the 2022 South Dakota gubernatorial election, losing to incumbent Republican governor Kristi Noem.

Career 
Smith is a real estate agent with Hegg Realtors, a former educator, and a member of the Democratic Party. He lives in Sioux Falls.

References

External links 

Representative Jamie Smith official government website
Jamie Smith for Governor campaign website
 

|-

|-

1971 births
21st-century American politicians
Augustana University alumni
Living people
Politicians from Sioux Falls, South Dakota
Democratic Party members of the South Dakota House of Representatives